Chedid is a surname. Notable people with the surname include:

People
Andrée Chedid (1920–2011), poet and novelist born in Cairo to Lebanese parents
João Chedid (1914–1991), first Maronite Bishop of the Maronite Catholic Eparchy of Our Lady of Lebanon of São Paulo in Brazil
John George Chedid (1923–2012), Maronite Bishop of the Maronite Catholic Eparchy of Our Lady of Lebanon of Los Angeles
Louis Chedid (born 1948), French singer-songwriter of Lebanese origin
Matthieu Chedid (born 1971), French rock singer-songwriter and guitar player
Miriam Shaded (born 1986), Polish entrepreneur, human rights activist and critic of Islam

Places
Estádio Nabi Abi Chedid, football (soccer) stadium in Bragança Paulista, São Paulo state, Brazil